Brices Cross Roads National Battlefield Site commemorates the Battle of Brices Crossroads, in which the Confederate army, under Major-General Nathan Bedford Forrest, defeated a much larger Union force on June 10, 1864, to ultimately secure supply lines between Nashville and Chattanooga, Tennessee.

The 1-acre site is a grassy park with a flagpole, memorial monument, and two cannons. There are no visitor services; information is provided at the visitor center for the Natchez Trace Parkway 15 miles south. The monument and site are very similar to that at Tupelo National Battlefield.

Description

The Brices Cross Roads National Battlefield Site, in Lee County, Mississippi, preserves the battlefield at Brices Cross Roads which extended northward into southwestern Prentiss County. This is the spot where the Brice family house once stood. It is located about 6 miles (10 km) west of Baldwyn, on Highway 370. The site features a memorial erected soon after the battlefield was designated as a historic site in 1929. In addition, on June 11, 2005, a second memorial was dedicated to Confederate Capt. John W. Morton, Chief of Artillery, and his battery. Brices Cross Roads is the only component of the National Park System designated a "battlefield site".

The modern Bethany Presbyterian Church is located on the southeast side of the crossroads. At the time of the battle, this congregation's meeting house was located further south along the Baldwyn Road. The Old Bethany Cemetery, adjacent to the battlefield site, predates the Civil War. Many of the area's earliest settlers are buried here. The graves of more than 90 Confederate soldiers killed in the battle are also located in this cemetery. Union dead from the battle were buried in common graves on the battlefield, but were later reinterred in the Memphis National Cemetery at Memphis, Tennessee.

The Brices Cross Roads Visitor Center, located in Baldwyn, is owned and operated by a public commission. Brices Cross Roads National Battlefield Commission, Inc., formed in 1994 by concerned local citizens, is also involved in protecting the greater battlefield, which is considered one of the most beautiful preserved battlefields of the American Civil War. With assistance from the American Battlefield Trust and the support of federal, state, and local governments, the commission has purchased for preservation  of the original battlefield.

Administrative history
The site was established February 21, 1929, and transferred from the War Department to the National Park Service on August 10, 1933. The battlefield was automatically listed on the National Register of Historic Places on October 15, 1966. It is administered under the Natchez Trace Parkway.

See also
Natchez Trace Parkway
National Register of Historic Places listings in Lee County, Mississippi
Tupelo National Battlefield

References

Further reading
The National Parks: Index 2001–2003. Washington: U.S. Department of the Interior.

External links

Brices Cross Roads National Battlefield Site at the American Battlefield Protection Program
Brice's Cross Roads National Battlefield Site at the Civil War Trust
Brices Cross Roads National Battlefield Site at the National Park Foundation

1929 establishments in Mississippi
American Civil War museums in Mississippi
American Civil War on the National Register of Historic Places
Conflict sites on the National Register of Historic Places in Mississippi
Battlefields of the Western Theater of the American Civil War
Museums in Lee County, Mississippi
Mississippi in the American Civil War
National Battlefields and Military Parks of the United States
National Park Service areas in Mississippi
National Register of Historic Places in Lee County, Mississippi
Protected areas established in 1929
Protected areas of Lee County, Mississippi